Sŵn Festival (sŵn is Welsh for "sound, noise") is a music festival founded by BBC Radio 1 DJ Huw Stephens and Cardiff-based promoter John Rostron. The festival takes place annually in Stephens' hometown of Cardiff, Wales. The first Sŵn Festival took place in November 2007. Bands playing included The Cribs, Beirut, David Holmes, Edwyn Collins and Cherry Ghost with DJs including Annie Mac.

Music is the festival's core medium. Stephens' eclectic musical taste is reflected in the diversity of the artists performing, and Welsh language bands are well represented on the line-up.

The 2008 festival took place on 14–16 November 2008. Bands playing included Golden Silvers, Truckers of Husk, Micachu and the Shapes, Little Comets, Young Marble Giants, Euros Childs, Colorama, Sweet Baboo and Rob Da Bank.

The 2009 festival took place on 22–24 October 2009. Dananananaykroyd, Johnny Foreigner, Copy Haho, Munch Munch, the Drums, Longcut, Girls, Gaggle, the Twilight Sad, Cate Le Bon, Talons, Sweet Baboo, and Cardiff-based band Los Campesinos! played. Venues used in 2009 were Chapter Arts Centre, Barfly, City Arms, Clwb Ifor Bach, Dempseys, Y Fuwch Goch, The Model Inn, The Toucan, Cardiff University Students Union, The Gate, The Vulcan and the National Museum Cardiff.

Sŵn festival 2013 took place in October in Cardiff City Centre with new venues added including the Sherman Theatre & the Angel Hotel. This edition of the event won the "Best Small Festival" accolade at the NME awards in 2014. The 2015 edition of Sŵn Festival was also nominated for "Best Small Festival" at the NME Awards.

In 2018 it was announced that Clwb Ifor Bach would take over the running of the festival as Stephens and Rostron departed.

References

External links 
Sŵn festival official site

Music festivals in Wales
Rock festivals in the United Kingdom
Recurring events established in 2007
Festivals in Cardiff
Annual events in Wales
Music in Cardiff
Autumn events in Wales